Lacy is an unincorporated community in Halbert Township, Martin County, in the U.S. state of Indiana.

History
A post office was established at Lacy in 1901, and remained in operation until it was discontinued in 1904.

Geography

References

Unincorporated communities in Martin County, Indiana
Unincorporated communities in Indiana